Eriolaena is a genus of flowering plants. Traditionally included in the family Sterculiaceae, it is included now in the recently expanded Malvaceae. The genus is distributed in Asia, from southern China through Indochina to India, Bangladesh, Nepal, and Sri Lanka, and in coastal Mozambique.

These plants are trees or shrubs. They usually have single or paired white or yellow flowers, but some species have larger inflorescences. The fruit is a hard capsule with winged seeds. The winged seeds make the genus distinctive in its family.

Species include:
 Eriolaena affinis
 Eriolaena candollei Wall. India and Bangladesh, Indochina, southern China
 Eriolaena glabrescens 
 Eriolaena hookeriana Wight & Arn. India and Sri Lanka
 Eriolaena kwangsiensis 
 Eriolaena lushingtonii Dunn Eastern Ghats (southern India)
 Eriolaena quinquelocularis (Wight & Arn.) Drury India, Yunnan (China)
 Eriolaena rulkensii Dorr northern Mozambique
 Eriolaena spectabilis (DC.) Planch. ex Mast.Himalayas (India, Nepal, Bhutan), northern Myanmar, Yunnan, Guizhou, and Guangxi (China)
 Eriolaena stocksii 
 Eriolaena wallichii DC. Nepal, Arunachal Pradesh (India), northern Myanmar, Yunnan (China)

References

 
Malvaceae genera
Taxonomy articles created by Polbot
Indomalayan realm flora
Flora of Mozambique